In Greek mythology, Galaxaura (Ancient Greek: Γαλαξαύρη Galaxaurê) was the 'lovely' Oceanid, one of the 3,000 water-nymph daughters of the Titans Oceanus and his sister-spouse Tethys. Her name means "calm" or "the charmer" or "like the refreshing coolness of a shady stream".

Mythology 
Along with her sisters, Galaxaura was one of the companions of Persephone when the daughter of Demeter was abducted by Hades.

Notes

References 

 Hesiod, Theogony from The Homeric Hymns and Homerica with an English Translation by Hugh G. Evelyn-White, Cambridge, MA.,Harvard University Press; London, William Heinemann Ltd. 1914. Online version at the Perseus Digital Library. Greek text available from the same website.
 The Homeric Hymns and Homerica with an English Translation by Hugh G. Evelyn-White. Homeric Hymns. Cambridge, MA.,Harvard University Press; London, William Heinemann Ltd. 1914. Online version at the Perseus Digital Library. Greek text available from the same website.
Kerényi, Carl, The Gods of the Greeks, Thames and Hudson, London, 1951.

Oceanids